Covas  may refer to the following places:

In Portugal
Figueiras e Covas, a parish in the municipality of Lousada
Covas (Tábua), a parish in the municipality of Tábua
Covas (Vila Nova de Cerveira), a parish in the municipality of Vila Nova de Cerveira
Covas (Vila Verde), a parish in the municipality of Vila Verde

In Spain
Covas, Viveiro, a parish of Viveiro, Lugo Province

Surname
Covas (surname)